George the Hagiorite (1009 – 27 June 1065) was a Georgian monk, calligrapher, religious writer, theologian, and translator, who spearheaded the activities of Georgian monastic communities in the Byzantine Empire. His epithets Mt'ats'mindeli and At'oneli, meaning "of the Holy Mountain" (Hagiorite) and "of Athos" (Athonite) respectively, are a reference to his association with the Iviron monastery on Mount Athos, where he served as hegumen.

One of the most influential Christian churchmen of medieval Georgia, George acted as an arbitrator and facilitator of cross-cultural engagement between his native country and the Byzantine Empire. He extensively translated the Fathers of the Church, the Psalms, works of exegesis and synaxaria from Greek – some things which had not previously existed in Georgian, revised some others, and improved the translations of one of his predecessors, Euthymius of Athos, to whom (and also to John of Athos) George dedicated his most important original work "The Vitae of John and Euthymius". Active also in Georgia, he helped regulate local canon law, and brought his young compatriots to be educated at Athos. His defense of the autocephaly of the Georgian Orthodox church when it was questioned by the Patriarch of Antioch made him one of the most venerated saints in Georgia. He featured prominently during the Great Schism between the Eastern and Western Christendom, being one of the few Eastern churchmen who defended the separated Western brethren.

Biography
George was born in Trialeti, a southern province of Georgia, into the aristocratic family of Jacob, sometime envoy of King Bagrat III of Georgia to Iran, and his wife Mariam. He was sent to a local monastery at Tadzrisi at the age of seven to commence his education and after three years moved to another, at Khakhuli. Around 1022, George was sent to Constantinople where he mastered Greek and gained a profound knowledge of Byzantine theology. After his return to Georgia in 1034 he took monastic tonsure at Khakhuli, then made a pilgrimage to Jerusalem and subsequently spent some time as the disciple of another Georgian monk, George the Recluse, on the Black Mountain near Antioch. In 1040, George established himself at the Iviron (literally, "of the Georgians") monastery on Mount Athos, Greece. Four years later, upon the death of the hegumen Stephanos, George was consecrated as his successor. He reorganized and refurbished the Iviron cloister, and made it into a vibrant center of Georgian Orthodox culture.

At some point between 1052 and 1057, George left his fellow monk George of Oltisi in charge of the Iviron monastery, and set off to Antioch to appear before the Patriarch to defend his brethren, accused by a group of the Greek clerics of heresy. The dispute quickly evolved around the canonical legality of the autocephaly of the Georgian Orthodox church, which had originally operated within the framework of the see of Antioch, but had been becoming increasingly independent since the 6th century. In defense of the Georgian autocephaly, George was referring to St. Andrew's mission to ancient Colchis and Iberia, a version which appears in medieval Georgian ecclesiastic tradition. Early in the 11th century, the autocephalous catholicos Melchizedek I (1012–30) assumed the additional title of patriarch, but Antioch was reluctant to recognize the move on the grounds that none of the Twelve Apostles had peregrinated in Georgia. In the end, George persuaded Theodosius III of Antioch to grant his confirmation to the autocephalous status of the Georgian church. This happened around the same time when the Byzantine government finally abandoned its efforts at forcing Georgia into submission, and reconciled with the Georgian king Bagrat IV.

In the gradually increasing polarity of the patriarchates of Rome and Constantinople that preceded the East-West Schism and the dénouement of 1054, the position of Georgian churchmen, and especially that of the Iviron monastery, was more lenient than the Greek (the other notable exceptions were Patriarch Peter III of Antioch and Metropolitan John III of Kiev). George was one of the few clerics in the Byzantine world who had deplored Michael I Cerularius’s stance towards the Western brethren aloud, and asserted, in 1064, in the presence of the Byzantine emperor Constantine X the inerrancy of the Roman church.

Although George declined Bagrat IV's repeated urges to lead the Georgian church, he, in 1057/8, took up the royal invitation to return to Georgia for five years. There, he initiated reforms in the Georgian church that were to contribute to a cleansed ecclesiastic hierarchy and regulate its relations with the increasingly strengthening royal authority. On his way back to Greece, George visited Constantinople and obtained the imperial decree for the education of Georgian students at Athos. He did not reach his destination, however, and died at Athens on 29 June 1065. The Athonite monks interred him at the Iviron monastery.

George the Hagiorite was subsequently canonized by the Georgian Orthodox Church and is remembered annually on 10 July.

Legacy

The influence of George’s legacy on Georgian religious tradition was immense. He worked on an updated translation of the Gospels and translated, more literally, writings of Basil of Caesarea, Gregory of Nyssa, Athanasius, John of Damascus, Nectarius of Constantinople, Dorotheus of Tyre and others. His translations as well as original works set the standards for the medieval Georgian hymnography, liturgy, and hagiography. His work may be considered as a continuation, and to some extent a rectification, of that of Euthymius (c. 955-1028), and marked the high point of the literary tradition flourishing at the foreign centers of Georgian monasticism.

The activity of George and his fellow Athonite Georgians laid a foundation for the basic principles of the practice and moral life of Christians as well as the relationship between the royal court and the church later promoted and officially adopted by the national ecclesiastic council of Ruisi-Urbnisi held under the presidency of the king David IV in 1103.

"The Vitae of Our Blessed Fathers John and Euthymius and an Account of their Worthy Achievements" (ცხოვრება ნეტარისა მამისა ჩუენისა იოანესი და ეფთჳმესი და უწყებაჲ ღირსისა მის მოქალაქობისა მათისაჲ) is George's most important original work, dedicated to his Athonite forerunners. It combines hagiography with religious and political propaganda, and historical record. Written some time after 1040, this manuscript of some 12,000 words in the Athos collection is a history and praise of the Iviron community, their contribution to the Georgian patristic literature and the defense of Byzantine monasticism. Apart from its political and theological message, George’s work is noted for its graphic rhythmic prose, describing the monks working in the garden and vineyards. In 1066, a year after his death, George himself became the subject of a similar biography by his disciple George the Minor (or Priest-Monk George [died post-1083]).

References

Further reading 
 Baramidze, Alexander (ed., 1966). "გიორგი მთაწმიდელი" (Giorgi Mt’ats’mindeli) in: ქართული ლიტერატურის ისტორია (History of Georgian Literature). Tbilisi: Sabchota Sakartvelo.
Lives of all saints commemorated on June 27: Venerable George of Mt. Athos, Georgian. Orthodox Church in America.

1009 births
1065 deaths
Athonite Fathers
Eastern Orthodox saints
Saints of Georgia (country)
Male writers from Georgia (country)
Christian monks from Georgia (country)
11th-century Christian saints
11th-century people from Georgia (country)
Byzantine people of Georgian descent
Calligraphers from Georgia (country)
People associated with Iviron Monastery